Biscayarfonna (Biscay glacier in Nynorsk) is an ice cap in Spitsbergen, Svalbard. This ice cap is named after Biscay in honour of the Basque whalers who hunted at Spitsbergen in the 17th and 18th centuries.

See also
List of glaciers in Svalbard

References

External links
Kayaking by Glaciers in Svalbard

Glaciers of Spitsbergen